Lina Pires de Campos née Del Vecchio (São Paulo, 18 June 1918 – São Paulo, 14 April 2003) was a Brazilian pianist, music educator and composer of both classical and popular music.

Life
Lina Pires de Campos was born in São Paulo, Brazil, the daughter of Italian luthier Angelo Del Vecchio. She studied piano with Ema Lubrano Franco and Léo Peracchi and music theory and composition with Furio Franceschini, Caldeira Filho and Osvaldo Lacerda. Later she studied composition with Camargo Guarnieri.

Pires de Campos worked as assistant to Magda Tagliaferro and in 1964 founded her own piano school. She won awards as a composer including in 1961 the Roquete Pinto medal and the second place composition prize from Radio Mec. Her works have been performed internationally.

Works
Selected works include:
Improvisação I for flute
Improvisação II for flute
Improvisação III for flute
Ponteio e Toccatina for guitar
Quatro Prelúdios for viola
Confession song (lyrics by Alice Guarnieri)
Embolada
I'm Like the Spring
Fad
Portrait
Tune
You Say He Loves Me

Her works have been recorded and issued on disc, including:
1984 25 Years of Composition, (LP)
1998 Lina Pires de Campos: Audible Universe Audio CD

References

1918 births
2003 deaths
20th-century classical composers
Brazilian music educators
Women classical composers
Brazilian classical composers
Brazilian women composers
Women music educators
20th-century women composers